The 2017–18 NC State Wolfpack men's basketball team represented North Carolina State University during the 2017–18 NCAA Division I men's basketball season. The Wolfpack, led by first-year head coach Kevin Keatts, played its home games at PNC Arena in Raleigh, North Carolina and were members of the Atlantic Coast Conference (ACC). They finished the season 21–12, 11–7 in ACC play to finish in a tie for third place. They lost in the second round of the ACC tournament to Boston College. They received an at-large bid to the NCAA tournament where they lost in the first round to Seton Hall.

Previous season
The Wolfpack finished the 2016–17 season 15–17, 4–14 in ACC play to finish in 13th place. They lost to Clemson in the first round of the ACC tournament.

Offseason

Departures

Class of 2017 Recruiting Class

Incoming transfers

Future recruits

2018–19 team recruits

Roster

Schedule and results

|-
!colspan=12 style=| Exhibition

|-
!colspan=12 style=| Non-conference regular season
  
   

|-
!colspan=12 style=| ACC regular season

|-
!colspan=12 style=| ACC Tournament

|-
!colspan=12 style="background:#E00000; color:white;"| NCAA tournament

References

NC State Wolfpack men's basketball seasons
Nc State
Nc State
2017 in sports in North Carolina
2018 in sports in North Carolina